The Kota Kinabalu City Waterfront is a mixed development projects comprising a shopping mall (Oceanus Waterfront Mall), hotel, city-resort home and boardwalk in Kota Kinabalu, Sabah, Malaysia. It is a waterfront revitalisation projects under the Sabah Development Corridor (SDC) as part of the efforts to transform Kota Kinabalu into a metropolitan city. Other part of the waterfront is the Jesselton Quay, Kota Kinabalu Convention City and One Jesselton Waterfront, which developed by different developers.

References 

Buildings and structures in Kota Kinabalu